D'Andre Rowe (born 5 January 2001) is a Caymanian footballer who plays as a defensive midfielder.

Career statistics

References

2001 births
Living people
Caymanian footballers
Association football midfielders
Cayman Islands youth international footballers
Cayman Islands international footballers
Cayman Islands under-20 international footballers